Jiří Pavlenka (born 14 April 1992) is a Czech professional footballer who plays as a goalkeeper for Werder Bremen and the Czech Republic national team.

Club career

Slavia Prague
Pavlenka joined Slavia Prague from Baník Ostrava in January 2016 for a transfer fee of €380,000. He won the league title with Slavia Prague in the 2016–17 Czech First League season.

Werder Bremen
In June 2017, Pavlenka joined Werder Bremen signing a three-year contract with the option of a fourth year. The transfer fee was estimated at €3 million.

In August 2018, following a strong debut season in the Bundesliga, Pavlenka agreed a contract extension with the club.

International career
Pavlenka has played international football at under-21 level for his country.

He got his first call up to the senior Czech Republic side for a friendly against Slovakia in March 2015. He made his debut for the senior side on 15 November 2016 in a friendly match against Denmark.

Career statistics

Club

International

Honours
Czech Republic
China Cup bronze: 2018

References

External links

1992 births
Living people
People from Hlučín
Czech footballers
Association football goalkeepers
Czech Republic under-21 international footballers
Czech Republic international footballers
Czech First League players
FC Baník Ostrava players
SK Slavia Prague players
SV Werder Bremen players
Bundesliga players
2. Bundesliga players
Czech expatriate footballers
Czech expatriate sportspeople in Germany
Expatriate footballers in Germany
Sportspeople from the Moravian-Silesian Region